was a town located in Sawa District, Gunma Prefecture, Japan.

As of 2003, the town had an estimated population of 31,221 and a density of 998.75 persons per km². The total area was 31.26 km².

On January 1, 2005, Sakai, along with the town of Akabori, and the village of Azuma (all from Sawa District), was merged into the expanded city of Isesaki and no longer exists as an independent municipality.

Gallery

External links
 Official website of Isesaki 

Dissolved municipalities of Gunma Prefecture
Isesaki, Gunma